The vireos  make up a family, Vireonidae, of small to medium-sized passerine birds found in the New World (Canada to Argentina, including Bermuda and the West Indies) and Southeast Asia. "Vireo" is a Latin word referring to a green migratory bird, perhaps the female golden oriole, possibly the European greenfinch.

They are typically dull-plumaged and greenish in color, the smaller species resembling wood warblers apart from their heavier bills. They range in size from the Chocó vireo, dwarf vireo and lesser greenlet, all at around 10cm and 8g, to the peppershrikes and shrike-vireos at up to 17cm and 40g.

Distribution and habitat
Most species are found in Middle America and northern South America.  Thirteen species of true vireos occur farther north, in the United States, Bermuda and Canada; of these all but Hutton's vireo are migratory.  Members of the family seldom fly long distances except in migration. They inhabit forest environments, with different species preferring forest canopies, undergrowth, or mangrove swamps.

A few species in the genus Vireo have appeared on the eastern side of the Atlantic as vagrants to the Western Palearctic.

Behaviour
The resident species occur in pairs or family groups that maintain territories all year (except Hutton's vireo, which joins mixed feeding flocks).  Most of the migrants defend winter territories against conspecifics.  The exceptions are the complex comprising the red-eyed vireo, the yellow-green vireo, the black-whiskered vireo, and the Yucatan vireo, which winter in small wandering flocks.

Voice

Males of most species are persistent singers.  Songs are usually rather simple, monotonous in some species of the Caribbean littoral and islands, and most elaborate and pleasant to human ears in the Chocó vireo and the peppershrikes.

Breeding
The nests of many tropical species are unknown.  Of those that are known, all build a cup-shaped nest that hangs from branches.  The female does most of the incubation, spelled by the male except in the red-eyed vireo complex.

Feeding
All members of the family eat some fruit but mostly insects and other arthropods. They take prey from leaves and branches; true vireos also flycatch, and the gray vireo takes 5 percent of its prey from the ground.

Systematics

The six genera of these birds make up the family Vireonidae, and are believed to be related to the crow-like birds in family Corvidae and the shrikes in family Laniidae. Recent biochemical studies have identified two babbler genera (Pteruthius and Erpornis) which may be Old World members of this family. Observers have commented on the vireo-like behaviour of the Pteruthius shrike-babblers, but apparently no-one suspected the biogeographically unlikely possibility of vireo relatives in Asia.

The family can be conveniently though perhaps inaccurately categorised by genus as the true vireos, the greenlets, the shrike-vireos and the peppershrikes. Preliminary genetic studies by Johnson et al. revealed large interspecific genetic distances between clades within Vireo and Hylophilus of a similar magnitude to differences between Cyclarhis and Vireolanius. Furthermore, some vireo and greenlet species may be closer to the peppershrikes than to their respective congeners. A more comprehensive study may reveal this family to be considerably undersplit at both the generic and species level.

Species in taxonomic order

References

External links

 Vireos (Vireonidae) information, including 33 species with videos and 40 with photographs at the Internet Bird Collection